José Ignacio Rivero (October 28, 1920 – August 3, 2011) was a Cuban exile and journalist.

Biography 

Rivero was born in Havana, Cuba. He is the grandson of Don Nicolas Rivero, who in 1832 founded the newspaper El Diario de la Marina, and the son of Pepin Rivero, who took over the newspaper upon the death of Don Nicolas in 1919. In 1960 the Cuban government confiscated the newspaper and Jose Ignacio Rivero left into exile where he continued his journalistic career in Spain and the United States.

Journalism 

Among the many honors Rivero received for his dedication and journalistic works are: The Grand Cross of Carlos Manuel de Cespedes, the Gold Medal of the Cuban Society of International Law and the Great Cross of Isabel the Catholic. The Vatican granted Rivero distinctions Knight of the Order of the Holy Sepulchre and Pro Ecclesia et Pontifex. In exile, Rivero humbly received from the Inter American Press Association (IAPA), the award of Hero of Freedom Award Press and the Mergenthaler Award. The U.S. government also awarded Rivero the Diploma of Honor Lincoln-Marti. Finally, in June 2011, he received the Cuban Heritage Award at the University of Miami.

Rivero's memoirs, Prado y Teniente Rey and Contra Viento y Marea Memorias de un Periodista: Periodismo y Mucho Mas, 1920–2004, recount his experiences as director of the Diario La Marina (Navy Newspaper) newspaper, the circumstances leading to his exile, and his ongoing activism on behalf of freedom of the press.

A rally, in Rivero's honor, was held on November 17, 1963, by Dr. Emilio Nunez-Portuondo in preparation for a visit by John F. Kennedy to Miami. The visit, which was aimed at dialoguing with members of the Inter-American Press Association, was able to generate an audience of "approximately 6,000 to 8,000 Cubans" according to United States Secret Service estimates.

Rivero lived in Miami, Florida, where he wrote for the Spanish language newspaper Diario Las Americas until his death on August 3, 2011.

References

External links
 Diario de la Marina in the Digital Library of the Caribbean

1920 births
2011 deaths
Cuban journalists
Male journalists
Maria Moors Cabot Prize winners
Knights of the Holy Sepulchre
Cuban expatriates in Spain
Cuban expatriates in the United States